Erik Hol (born 13 October 1985 in Hoorn) is a Dutch darts player who competes in Professional Darts Corporation events.

He made his PDC European Tour debut in the 2019 Dutch Darts Masters, but lost 6–0 to Dennis Nilsson of Sweden.

References

External links

1985 births
Living people
Professional Darts Corporation associate players
Dutch darts players